Ningi is a town, a local government area, and an emirate in Bauchi State, Nigeria. The Ningi emirate comprises two local government areas, Ningi and Warji, with a combined area of 5,250 km2 and a population of 501,912 according to the 2006 Census. The Ningi local government area covers an area of 4,625 km2 with a population of 387,192 at the 2006 Census. The area is inhabited mostly by Fulani, Warjawa, Duwa, Ningawa.Yunusa Muhammadu Danyaya is the current Emir of Ningi.

Local Government

Ningi Local Government Area is in the town of Ningi and the area council comprises 14 districts;
Ningi
Bashe
Balma
Jangu
Kudu
Kurmi
Nasaru
Burra
Balma
Sama
Tiffi
Kyata
Gudu
Yamma

History
Ningi state was founded by an enclave of Islamic scholars known as the Mallams in the 18th century (around 1847) under the leadership of Hamza. Ningi leaders were hitherto called Mallams until early the 19th century. Fa'awa are the first tribe to gain the benefit of western education, but the remaining tribe came to Ningi as visitors and they remain due to the abundant food item provided by Fa'awa people. except Marawa which are origin of Ningi land.

According to legend, Hamza migrated with forty other Mallams and their families from Tsakuwar Kano, in the present day Dawakin Kudu Local Government Area of Kano State, in 1827. They settled eastward at Mara in the present day's divided into two some are in Butu Kudu-Yamma district of Ningi and lame  district of the Toro, Nigeria local government area in Bauchi State. The Mallams were protesting the payment of a tax called Kudin Kasa in the Kano Emirate during the reign of Sarkin Kano Mohammed Bello. While at Mara, Sheikh Hamza used his Islamic knowledge and magic (Sihr) to convince the local people under their leader called Dandaura to break their allegiance of the Amanah Agreement; entered into with the Fulani Emirate in which they paid tribute (jizya) to the leader. By 1830, in order to change the status quo, Hamza had to crush Dandaura and remain the undisputed leader. He immediately brought all the neighboring stateless societies, especially the Butawa, Fa'awa, Warjawa, Kudawa, Sirawa, under his control. This act became a threat to the peace and security of the neighboring emirates of Bauchi, Kano, and Zaria. As a result, Bauchi and Kano combined their forces and launched an attack on Hamza.

With the death of Hamza, the people suffered from the loss but remained organized and selected Ahmadu in 1850 to be their leader. Hamza's wife Atta was very influential following his death in choosing leaders of Ningi. Ahmadu reigned for five years and died in 1855. The people, with the great influence and political dexterity of Atta, the council of Malams chose Hamza's son-in-law, Abubakar Danmaje, as the next leader. Unlike his predecessors, Danmaje started an expansionist policy and devised very effective raiding strategies. He raided far and wide to Kano, Hadejia, Katagum, Jamare, Gombe, Zaria, Birnin Gwari, Kontagora, Wukari, and even Illorin. Danmaje found it necessary to raid so as to recruit slaves into his ranks. The result was the creation of a strong, formidable, and insurmountable force with commanded by him. This force was known as Mai Tabaryar Mashi.

Apart from the expansion of the territory and establishment of a powerful force, the Danmaje reign was significant for the movement of the people to the old Ningi, situated in a strategic and frontier position surrounded by hills. It was the obscure location of the place that earned Ningi its name, which in the Butawa language means "hiding place." With such a strategic position, Danmaje continued the campaign by intensifying his sporadic raids. In fact Bauchi feared Danmaje so much that the emir of Bauchi, Ibrahim had to establish Kafin-Madaki; with the sole aim of preventing him from entering Bauchi. Kafin Madaki was however to serve as a dog watch with the specific instruction of not confronting Danmaje but quickly reporting any move made by the Ningawa to raid Bauchi.

After Danmaje's death in 1870 his successor, Haruna Karami, continued the expansionist policy with the strong backing of his able lieutenant Usman Danyaya, the then barden of Ningi. Haruna died in 1886 and Abubakar Gajigi was appointed the leader. Abubakar maintained Ningi's struggle to survive as a state of its own without losing any territory to the neighboring emirates.

Then came the reign of Usman Danyaya. Considering its history as an independent state with an organized system of administration based on Islamic provisions, the British modernized the system by making Ningi a native authority. By this act Ningi became one of the few areas to be made a native authority the very year the British came into the administration of northern Nigeria.

Usman was succeeded by Mamuda, who was under the guidance of the British. This continued with Musa Dangwido (1905–1906) and Mallam Mamuda again (1906–1908). Adamu Danyaya was the second longest to reign as the Emir of Ningi, having ruled for 32 years. The present Emir Yunusa Mohammadu Danyaya, who came into power in early 1978, is so far the longest reign; having ruled over 39 years now.

List of rulers
 Hamza – 1847–1849
 Ahmadu – 1850–1855
 Abubakar Danmaje – 1855–1870
 Haruna Karami – 1870–1886
 Abubakar Gajigi – 1886–1890
 Usman Danyaya – 1890-1890
 Mamuda Lolo – 1902–1905
 Musa Dangwido – 1905–1906
 (Restoration of) Mamuda Lolo – 1906–1908
 Abdu mai Fatima – 1908–1915
 Zakari Dankaka – 1915–1922 
 Adamu Danyaya – 1922–1955
 Haruna II – 1955–1957
 Abdullahi Adamu Danyaya – 1957–1961
 Ibrahim Gurama – 1963–1977
 Yunusa Muhammadu Danyaya – 1978–current

Notable people
Idi Othman Guda
Abdul Ahmed Ningi, Senator, representing Bauchi Central
 M W O Musa Tata Ningi, R S M Provost Jaji Military Cantonment Kaduna State
 Isa Sa'ad Ningi'''
 Ibrahim Shehu Usman, Managing Director/CEO Jaiz Takaful Insurance Plc Abuja.
Dr. Sabi’u A. Sani
 DIG Saleh Abubakar Ningi
 Salisu Zakari Ningi Member House of Representatives
 Sheikh Salihu Sulaiman Ningi
Hon.Abubakar Y. Suleiman (Dan Galadiman Ningi)
Hon. Abubakar Muh’d Sammako (Mai-Dalan Ningi)
Eng.Ibrahim Musa (Dan-Masanin Ningi)
Muhammad Habib Aliyu (Tafidan Ningi and former Minister of State for Transportation 2005-2007)

References

External links
Maplibrary.org: Ningi

Local Government Areas in Bauchi State